Lucio Fernando Barroca (born 30 May 1993) is an Argentine professional footballer who plays as an attacking midfielder.

Career statistics

References

External links

1993 births
Living people
Association football midfielders
Argentine footballers
People from Tres Arroyos
Argentine expatriate footballers
Expatriate footballers in Costa Rica
Argentine expatriate sportspeople in Costa Rica
Expatriate footballers in Nicaragua
Argentine expatriate sportspeople in Nicaragua
Huracán de Tres Arroyos footballers
Bella Vista de Bahía Blanca footballers
Huracán de Comodoro Rivadavia footballers
Club Atlético Los Andes footballers
Real Estelí F.C. players
Torneo Argentino A players
Torneo Argentino B players
Primera Nacional players
Liga FPD players
Nicaraguan Primera División players
Sportspeople from Buenos Aires Province